The Wake knot or Ormond knot  is  an English heraldic knot used historically as an heraldic badge by the Wake family, lords of the manor of Bourne in Lincolnshire and also by the Butler family, Earls of Ormond.

Form
It takes the form of a Carrick bend knot connecting two ropes but the Wake knot shows the knot joining a rope and a strap.

Usage
It is depicted in the coat of arms of Bourne Town Council and Bourne Academy,  Lincolnshire where the Wakes were lords of the manor. 

The crest of the arms of the Isle of Ely County Council  was a human hand grasping a trident around which an eel was entwined; on the wrist of the hand was a Wake knot, representing Hereward the Wake.

The crest of No. 2 Squadron RAF includes a Wake knot; its motto is Hereward.

References

Decorative knots
Heraldic knots